This article summarizes the events, album releases, and album release dates in hip hop music for the year 2019.

Events

January
On January 8, Cupcakke was hospitalized following a suicide scare.
On January 23, 6ix9ine admitted to being guilty of all charges related to racketeering and gang violence.
 On January 25, DMX was again released from prison.
On January 27, Florida rapper Jayo Sama was killed in a drive-by shooting in West Palm Beach, Florida. He was 22 years old.

February
 On February 3, 21 Savage was arrested by the U.S. Immigration and Customs Enforcement (ICE) for having an expired visa and was revealed to be a United Kingdom national.
 On February 9, English grime rapper Cadet was killed in a car accident, at age 28.
 On February 10, Cardi B won a Grammy Award for Best Rap Album with Invasion of Privacy and Drake won a Grammy Award for Best Rap Song with God's Plan.
 On February 12, Mystikal was released from prison on $3 million bond.
 On February 13, YNW Melly turned himself in to authorities and was charged with the double murder of rappers and childhood friends YNW Sakchaser and YNW Juvy. The same day that 21 Savage was released from ICE custody on bond.
 On February 28, BlocBoy JB was arrested for drug and weapons charges.

March
 On March 26, Billboard controversially removes Lil Nas X's breakout single "Old Town Road" from the Hot Country Songs chart for "not [embracing] enough elements of today's country music".
 On March 31, Nipsey Hussle was fatally shot outside his clothing store in Los Angeles, CA. He was 33 years old

April
 On April 18, Cypress Hill receives a star in the walk of fame, making them the first Latino group to receive a star in the walk of fame.
 On April 21, Kanye West lead an Easter Sunday Service performance at Coachella, the group's first public performance.

May
On May 18, it was revealed that Tyler, the Creator’s ban in the United Kingdom had been lifted in an announcement for a London concert promoting his newly released album Igor. However, the show was cancelled due to overcrowding audience.

June
 On June 9, Bushwick Bill of the Geto Boys died at the age of 52, from pancreatic cancer.
 On June 20, the 2019 XXL Freshman Class was revealed, in which it included Gunna, DaBaby, Roddy Ricch, Cordae, Megan Thee Stallion, Lil Mosey, Blueface, Comethazine, Tierra Whack, YK Osiris, and Rico Nasty.

July
 On July 1, Lil Nas X's "Old Town Road" becomes the longest-running hip-hop song at number one on the Billboard Hot 100 after thirteen weeks, surpassing "Lose Yourself" by Eminem, "Boom Boom Pow" by the Black Eyed Peas, and "See You Again" by Wiz Khalifa featuring Charlie Puth, which had each achieved twelve weeks at number one.
On July 23, Tay-K was sentenced to 55 years in prison on a murder charge for a 2016 robbery that left a man dead.

September
 On September 5, Nicki Minaj announces her retirement from making music to "have my family".

October
 On October 2, Gucci Mane partnered with Gucci.
 On October 6, 2 Chainz partnered with Atlantic Records with his independent label The Real University.
 On October 15, Tyga signed a multi-million dollar deal to be with Columbia Records.
 On October 23, Lil Nas X's "Old Town Road" received an RIAA Diamond certification, 2019's first Diamond certification and the fastest song in history to reach this milestone.

November
 On November 6, Drake signed with the cannabis industry.
 On November 11, Bad Azz died four days earlier by the time he was arrested and jailed at Southwest Detention Center in Murrieta, California, on domestic violence charges.
 On November 13, Kodak Black is sentenced to three years and eight months prison time for lying about his criminal record while purchasing firearms.
 On November 21, French Montana was hospitalized due to stomach pains nausea and elevated heart rate.

December
 On December 8, Juice WRLD was pronounced dead after suffering a seizure in Chicago Midway Airport  According to TMZ, he died of a percocet overdose and swallowed all the pills so federal agents wouldn't find them on the jet.
 On December 18, 6ix9ine was sentenced to two years in jail after already serving 13 months because of racketeering and gang violence. However, he would get out of jail only months after originally being incarcerated due to his life-threatening asthma diagnosis.

Released albums

January

February

March

April

May

June

July

August

September

October

November

December

Highest-charting songs

Highest first-week consumption

All critically reviewed albums ranked

Metacritic

AnyDecentMusic?

See also
Previous article: 2018 in hip hop music
Next article: 2020 in hip hop music

References

hip hop
2010s in hip hop music
Hip hop music by year